HMS Avon was a Vickers three-funnel, 30-knot destroyer ordered by the Royal Navy under the 1895–1896 Naval Estimates.  She was the fifth ship to carry this name since it was introduced in 1805 for an 18-gun brig-sloop, sunk in 1847.

Construction and career
She was laid down on 17 February 1896, at the Barrow Shipbuilding Company shipyard at Barrow-in-Furness, and launched on 10 October 1896.  During her builder's trials she made her contracted speed requirement.  In 1897 during the construction of these ships, the Barrow Shipbuilding Company was purchases by Vickers, Sons and Maxim and renamed as the Naval Construction and Armaments Shipyard.  Avon was completed and accepted by the Royal Navy in January 1899. After commissioning, HMS Avon was assigned to the East Coast Flotilla based at Harwich.  She was deployed in Home waters for her entire service life.

In early January 1901 she was part of the Medway instructional flotilla, as Lieutenant John Roderick Segrave was appointed in command on 23 January. In early March 1902 she was at Chatham for repairs, after encountering a heavy gale during a cruise, and the following month she was paid off and her crew transferred to the destroyer . She subsequently had her boiler retubed at Chatham dockyard.

On 30 August 1912 the Admiralty directed all destroyer classes were to be designated by alpha characters starting with the letter 'A'. After 30 September 1913, she was known as a C-class destroyer and had the letter ‘C’ painted on the hull below the bridge area and on either the fore or aft funnel.

World War I
In September 1914 the 7th was redeployed to the Humber River. Her employment within the Humber Patrol included anti-submarine and counter-mining patrols.

In November 1916 she deployed to the Irish Sea Hunting Flotilla until the cessation of hostilities, providing anti-submarine and counter-smuggling patrols following the Easter Uprising of 1916 in Dublin.

In 1919 she was paid off and laid-up in reserve awaiting disposal.  She was sold on 1 July 1920 to Castle of Plymouth for breaking.

Pennant Numbers

References
NOTE:  All tabular data under General Characteristics only from the listed Jane's Fighting Ships volume unless otherwise specified

Bibliography
 
 
 
 
 
 
 
 

 

Ships built in Barrow-in-Furness
1896 ships
C-class destroyers (1913)
World War I destroyers of the United Kingdom